The Dard is a short (2.1 km) tributary of the Seille de Beaume in the  department of Jura in France. The Dard rises in the steephead valley known as the Reculée de Baume, and flows through the valley to the village of Baume-les-Messieurs, where it joins the Seille de Beaume. At its source there is a notable series of show caves, which can be visited.

References

Rivers of France
Rivers of Bourgogne-Franche-Comté
Rivers of Jura (department)